Petrovskaya is a rural locality (a village) in Kargopolsky District, Arkhangelsk Oblast, Russia. The population was 142 as of 2012. There are 3 streets.

Geography 
Petrovskaya is located 15 km north of Kargopol (the district's administrative centre) by road. Turovo is the nearest rural locality.

References 

Rural localities in Kargopolsky District